William Joseph Holland (March 3, 1874 in Boston, Massachusetts – November 20, 1930 in Malden, Massachusetts) was an American track and field athlete.

At the age of 26, Holland, a medical student at Georgetown University, won the silver medal in the men's 400-meter dash race at the 1900 Summer Olympics, in Paris, France, with a time of 49.6 seconds, just 2 tenth of a second behind Gold medal winner U.S. teammate Maxie Long.

Holland placed fourth in the 200-meter dash, winning his semifinal heat with a time of 24.0 seconds before finishing fourth of four in the hotly contested final, in which his estimated time of 22.9 seconds was identical to that of the bronze medalist Stan Rowley and 0.1 seconds slower than the second place man, Norman Pritchard.  Holland also competed in the 60-meter dash event, placing third in his first-round heat and not advancing to the final.

References

External links 

1874 births
1930 deaths
American male sprinters
Olympic silver medalists for the United States in track and field
Athletes (track and field) at the 1900 Summer Olympics
Georgetown University School of Medicine alumni
Medalists at the 1900 Summer Olympics
Sportspeople from Boston